Roland Schwegler (born 3 February 1982) is a Swiss former professional footballer who played as a defender.

Career
Schwegler scored a hattrick for his former club Grasshopper in their final match of the 2006 calendar year, a 3–3 draw with FC Schaffhausen.

References

External links

Interview at JustCantBeatThat.com

1982 births
Living people
Footballers from Bern
Association football defenders
Grasshopper Club Zürich players
FC Luzern players
Swiss men's footballers
Swiss expatriates in Liechtenstein
Swiss Super League players
Expatriate footballers in Liechtenstein